Erbessa corvica is a moth of the family Notodontidae first described by Paul Dognin in 1923. It is found in Bolivia.

References

Moths described in 1923
Notodontidae of South America